Kangy Angy is a semi-rural suburb of the Central Coast region of New South Wales, Australia. It is in a small valley along Ourimbah Creek and the Pacific Highway. It is part of the  local government area.

Home to a section of the convict built Great North Road, the area remained important as a hill crossing between Sydney and Newcastle until large scale earthworks permitted the development of more direct roads and highways.

Nowadays it is home to several small farms and pasture used for agistment. The valley is bordered by State Forest to the north and west and the Sydney-Newcastle railway line to the south-east. Koalas, grey wallabies, echidnas, wombats, sugar gliders, and many bird and reptile species have been documented in the undeveloped forest of the valley. Some isolated patches of temperate rainforest add diversity to the nature of the valley. The Kangy Angy Maintenance Centre is under construction to maintain the NSW TrainLink New Intercity Fleet.

References

Suburbs of the Central Coast (New South Wales)